Jan Nolte (born 30 December 1988) is a German politician. Born in Bremen, he represents Alternative for Germany (AfD). Jan Nolte has served as a member of the Bundestag from the state of Hesse since 2017.

Life 
He became member of the bundestag after the 2017 German federal election. He is a member of the defense committee.

Nolte is married with the German-Russian right-wing activist Katrin Nolte (née Ziske).

References

External links 

 Bundestag biography 

1988 births
Living people
Members of the Bundestag for Hesse
Members of the Bundestag 2021–2025
Members of the Bundestag 2017–2021
Members of the Bundestag for the Alternative for Germany